Myron Pierman "Mynie" Sutton (October 9, 1903, Niagara Falls - June 17, 1982, Niagara Falls) was a Canadian alto saxophonist and bandleader.

Sutton worked in dance ensembles in Buffalo, New York and Cleveland, Ohio between 1924 and 1931. He returned to Canada in 1931 and founded the Canadian Ambassadors in Aylmer, Quebec; this was one of very few black jazz bands based out of Canada in the 1930s. The group operated out of Montreal from 1933, playing at Connie's Inn, the Hollywood Club, and Cafe Montmartre, in addition to doing tours of Quebec and Ontario. Pianists in the ensemble included Lou Hooper and Buster Harding.

By 1941 the Ambassadors had disbanded, and Sutton returned to his birthplace of Niagara Falls, where he played locally for decades. He made no commercial recordings. A collection of materials devoted to Sutton is held at the Concordia University library in Montreal.

References
Litchfield/Miller, "Mynie Sutton". Grove Jazz online.

1903 births
1982 deaths
Canadian jazz bandleaders
Canadian jazz saxophonists
Male saxophonists
20th-century saxophonists
20th-century Canadian male musicians
Canadian male jazz musicians
Canadian expatriates in the United States